Jose Bayani "Pepito" Hidalgo Laurel Jr. (August 27, 1912 – March 11, 1998), also known as Jose B. Laurel Jr., was a Filipino politician who was elected twice as speaker of the House of Representatives of the Philippines. A stalwart of the Nacionalista Party, he was the party's candidate for the country's vice president in the 1957 elections.

Early life
He was born on August 27, 1912 in Tanauan, Batangas, the eldest son of Jose P. Laurel, who would serve as president of the Philippines from 1943 to 1945, and Pacencia Hidlago Laurel. His brother, Salvador, would become vice-president in 1986, Sotero would be elected as a senator in 1987. Another brother, Jose S. Laurel III, served as ambassador to Japan. His youngest brother, Arsenio, was the first two-time winner of the Macau Grand Prix.

Laurel finished his intermediate and secondary education in Manila, and enrolled at the University of the Philippines. In 1936, he received his law degree from the U.P. College of Law and passed the bar exams the following year. There, he served as president of the U.P. Student Council and captain of the university's debate team. He was a member of the Upsilon Sigma Phi fraternity.

Political career
In 1941, Laurel won his first election, as a member of the House of Representatives from the 3rd district of Batangas. However, his term was interrupted by the Japanese invasion in late 1941. For the duration of the war, Laurel assisted his father, who was designated as president of the Philippines under the Second Philippine Republic, and served as a representative for the at-large district of Batangas in the National Assembly from 1943 to 1944.

Beginning in March 1945, Laurel, together with his family, Camilo Osías, Benigno Aquino Sr., Gen. Tomas Capinpin, and Jorge B. Vargas evacuated to Baguio. Shortly after the city fell, they traveled to Tuguegarao, where they embarked a bomber plane to Japan via Formosa (now Taiwan) and Shanghai, China. On September 15, days after Japan formally surrendered to the United States, his father, his brother Jose III, and Aquino were arrested by a group of Americans headed by a Colonel Turner for collaborating with Imperial Japan and were imprisoned in Japan. He later joined the rest of the Laurel family in flying back to Manila on November 2.

Laurel's term as representative for the 3rd district of Batangas began only in 1945. When the Philippine Congress was restored upon independence in 1946, he again sought election to the House of Representatives representing the 3rd district of Batangas. He was successful in his bid, having been re-elected to the second and third congresses. In 1954, he was elected to his first term as speaker of the House. He decided not to seek re-election for his seat in the House in 1957 as he was drafted instead to run for vice president under the Nacionalista ticket spearheaded by President Carlos P. Garcia. He was defeated by Diosdado Macapagal of the Liberal Party even as Garcia went on to victory.

In 1961, Laurel regained his seat in the House of Representatives and would serve in that capacity until martial law was declared in 1972. He was again elected speaker in February 1967 and remained in that position until 1971, when Cornelio Villareal (Capiz–2nd) of the Liberal Party regained the speakership. Laurel retired from politics after Congress was closed in 1972. However, he came out of retirement as he would be elected as an assemblyman from Batangas in the Regular Batasang Pambansa in 1984, serving until 1986. He was a member of the opposition United Nationalist Democratic Organization party. He also became a member of the 1986 Constitutional Commission that drafted the present Philippine Constitution.

During his congressional career, Laurel focused on economic issues. He was an advocate of a planned economy and protectionism. Laurel was among those who, in 1965, recruited Senate president Ferdinand Marcos to join the Nacionalista Party as its presidential candidate against Diosdado Macapagal.

Death and family
Laurel died of pneumonia at the age of 85 on March 11, 1998.

Two of his children, Jose Macario IV and Milagros ("Lally"), also became members of the House of Representatives, representing the same seat their father had held. The actor Noel Trinidad was his son-in-law.

Notes

References

External links
 

1912 births
1998 deaths
Jose B. Jr.
People from Batangas
Speakers of the House of Representatives of the Philippines
Members of the House of Representatives of the Philippines from Batangas
University of the Philippines alumni
Nacionalista Party politicians
KALIBAPI politicians
Filipino collaborators with Imperial Japan
20th-century Filipino lawyers
Children of presidents of the Philippines
Candidates in the 1957 Philippine vice-presidential election
Minority leaders of the House of Representatives of the Philippines
Members of the National Assembly (Second Philippine Republic)
Members of the Batasang Pambansa
Members of the Philippine Constitutional Commission of 1986